Don't Get Personal is a 1922 American silent comedy film directed by Clarence G. Badger and starring Marie Prevost, George Nichols and Daisy Jefferson.

Cast
 Marie Prevost as Patricia Parker 
 George Nichols as Silas Wainwright 
 Daisy Jefferson as Emily Wainwright 
 Roy Atwell as Horace Kane 
 T. Roy Barnes as John Wainwright 
 Del Lorice as Maisie Morrison 
 Sadie Gordon as Arabella New 
 Alida B. Jones as Jane New 
 Ralph McCullough as Jimmie Barton

References

Bibliography
 Munden, Kenneth White. The American Film Institute Catalog of Motion Pictures Produced in the United States, Part 1. University of California Press, 1997.

External links
 

1922 films
1922 comedy films
1920s English-language films
American silent feature films
Silent American comedy films
Films directed by Clarence G. Badger
American black-and-white films
Universal Pictures films
1920s American films